Collector's Item is the debut studio album of the Filipino trio Apo Hiking Society. It's a 13-track album released in 1975 under the Sunshine label.

Track listing
Move (3:43)
Time Can Let It Wait (3:11)
Rock n' Roll Music (Medley) (With Apologies to The Beatles) (5:59)
Kasal (3:12)
Softly (3:11)
Be Right (2:58)
Leaving (2:58)
Let Me Sing You a Song (Medley) (With Apologies to Donovan) (6:25)
Ano ang Ibig Mong Sabihin (2:50)
I Love You (2:53)
Be Nice to Your Fine Feather Friend (0:21)

Related links
The Official Apo Hiking Society Website 

APO Hiking Society albums
1975 albums